John Strange (1818 – 6 September 1840) was an English first-class cricketer.

The son of John Strange senior, he was born in 1818 at St John's Wood. He was educated at Winchester College. Strange later played first-class cricket for the Marylebone Cricket Club (MCC) from 1836–39, making eleven appearances. Playing primarily as a bowler, he took 32 wickets in his eleven matches and twice took a five wicket haul. In addition to playing for the MCC, Strange also made two first-clas appearances for the Gentlemen in the Gentlemen v Players fixtures of 1836 and 1838 at Lord's, taking four wickets. Strange died at Paris in September 1840.

References

External links

1818 births
1840 deaths
People from St John's Wood
People educated at Winchester College
English cricketers
Marylebone Cricket Club cricketers
Gentlemen cricketers